South Bank ferry wharf may refer to:

South Bank 1 & 2 ferry wharf - CityCat wharves in Brisbane, Queensland, Australia
South Bank 3 ferry wharf - CityFerry wharf in Brisbane, Queensland, Australia